Tawil (Arabic: طويل‎, 'long') is a meter used in classical Arabic poetry.

Tawil may also refer to:

People
Adel Tawil (born 1978), German singer, songwriter and producer
Emmanuel Tawil, French academic and lawyer
Hanan El Tawil (1966–2004), Egyptian actress and singer
Helga Tawil-Souri (born 1969), Palestinian–American writer and documentary filmmaker
Issam Haitham Taweel (born 1989), Egyptian tennis player
Joseph Tawil (1913–1999), Melkite Greek Catholic archbishop
Macarius IV Tawil (died 1815), Melkite Greek Catholic patriarch
Raymonda Tawil (born 1940), Palestinian writer and journalist
Rosarita Tawil (born 1988), Lebanese model
Suha Arafat (born 1963), widow of former Palestinian Authority President Yasser Arafat

Other uses
Esoteric interpretation of the Quran (Arabic: تأويل, taʾwīl)

See also

Tavil (disambiguation)